Karkh or Al-Karkh (Arabic: الكرخ) is historically the name of the western half of Baghdad, Iraq, or alternatively, the western shore of the Tigris River as it ran through Baghdad. The eastern shore is known as Al-Rasafa. Its name is derived from the Syriac (ܟܪܟܐ) Karkha; citadel.

In a more limited sense Karkh is one of nine administrative districts in Baghdad, with Mansour district to the west, Kadhimiya district to the northwest, and the Tigris to the north, east and south. The Green Zone (International Zone) is in this district.

Today, it is also a neighborhood between the International Zone and the Tigris.

See also 
 Al-Karkh Sport Club
 List of places in Iraq
 List of neighborhoods and districts in Baghdad
 Maruf Karkhi

References

Neighborhoods in Baghdad
Administrative districts in Baghdad